Iskar Stadium is a multi-use all-seater stadium in Samokov, Bulgaria named after "Iskar" river.

It is currently used for football matches and is the home ground of PFC Rilski Sportist.  The stadium holds 7,000 people. It is located in the southwestern part of Samokov near the biggest park of the city - "Gradski", just off the 82 main road to the ski resort Borovets. The best attendance was on 22.10.2002 a match between PFC Rilski Sportist (ПФК Рилски спортист Самоков) and PFC Levski Sofia (ПФК Левски София) - 6 800 spectators.

History
Iskar Stadium was officially opened in 1972, particularly renovated in 2005.

The stadium was used for athletics competitions.

Concert venue
The stadium has hosted some music shows.

Location
The stadium is located in the southwestern part of Samokov near the biggest park of the city - "Gradski", just off the 82 main road to the ski resort Borovets.

References

Football venues in Bulgaria
Samokov
Buildings and structures in Sofia Province